Lavina Rose Williams (born 13 June 1979) is a New Zealand musical artist and musical theatre performer.

Williams began her career as a member of the 1990s the girl group Ma-V-Elle. The group had multiple songs in the New Zealand music charts, including Never Say Goodbye, Freedom, Show Me Heaven, and Three Flow.

In 2006, Williams competed in the 4th season of Australian Idol, finishing in the top 8 of the competition.

Williams briefly joined her younger sister's girl group Young Divas in 2007. She has since pursued a musical theatre career, performing in The Lion King, Hairspray, Dream Girls, and Sister Act.

As a singer, she has been the backing vocalist for many New Zealand artists including Ginny Blackmore and Stan Walker. She featured in her brother J. Williams's song Stand with You, which reached 6th in the New Zealand charts.

Williams has also featured in some of Mika Haka's singles, including Coffee and Loved Me A Man.

Ma-V-Elle

The group formed at James Cook High School, Manurewa in the mid 1990s. Ma-V-Elle's name comes from the first names of the three members - Marina, Lavina and Maybelle. The group was originally managed by Tim Mahon. Their debut album Spoken To was released in 1997, with the trio touring nationally and internationally, including two performances at Ronnie Scott's Jazz Club in London.

Member Marina Davis left in 1998 for religious reasons, with Maybelle and Lavina continuing as a duo. The group released their second album, Angel in 1999, with a heavier, drum and bass-inspired sound. Both Maybelle Galuvao and Lavina Williams were nominated for the Most Promising Female Vocalist award at the 2000 New Zealand Music Awards, losing to Vanessa Kelly of Deep Obsession.

Ma-V-Elle performed together for the first time in 13 years with a surprise reunion at the 2013 Pacific Music Awards. The group released new single "Let's Go (To the Sky)" and performed at the Parachute music festival in January 2014.

Australian Idol

Top 24: "(You Make Me Feel like) a Natural Woman" by Aretha Franklin
Top 12: "If I Ain't Got You" by Alicia Keys Bottom 2
Top 11: "Bring Me to Life" by Evanescence
Top 10: "Don't Leave Me This Way" by Thelma Houston Bottom 3
Top 9: "Too Much Heaven" by The Bee Gees
Top 8: "Best of My Love" by The Emotions Eliminated

Notable performances

Williams has been a regular performer at Christmas in the Park. She performed in 2014, and returned in 2015 to sing a solo of Joy to the World and perform Aotearoa with Stan Walker. She also performed in 2016, 2017, 2018, and 2019.

She performed regularly at the Big Gay Out event at Coyle Park. She has performed in 2014, 2015, 2016 and 2017.

Personal life

Williams is the older sister to J. Williams, Emily Williams and Ezra Williams.

She was born in New Zealand, and is of Samoan and Fijian descent.

Discography

with Ma-V-Elle

Albums 

 Spoken To (1997)
 Angel (1999)

Singles

Featured on

Awards

References

1979 births
Living people
21st-century New Zealand women singers
New Zealand people of Samoan descent
New Zealand people of Fijian descent
People from Auckland
20th-century New Zealand women singers